St. Edmund's Church  is a small church in Møllergata in Oslo, Norway. It was built in 1883–84, and is home to the Norwegian congregation of the Church of England.  The church was consecrated by the Bishop of Fulham on 27 July 1884.

Queen Maud used to visit this church, and there is a bust of her in the church, which otherwise is adorned with stained glass windows.

The church has a modest size. While churches often dominate their surroundings and towers stretch over neighbouring buildings, this church is modestly squeezed between larger buildings. It is said, however, that it came more into its own after some old buildings around it were demolished.

The church has – despite its small size – the shape of a cathedral. It was designed by architect Paul Due and Bernhard Steckmest, in yellow and red brick in a simple, neo-Gothic style. The church was restored in 1990, and the tower was then replaced with a new one of roughly the same shape and size as the original.

See also 
 Anglicanism in Norway

External links 
 Official website

References 

Churches in Oslo
Churches completed in 1884
19th-century Anglican church buildings
1884 establishments in Norway
Anglican church buildings in Norway
Edmund